William Benz Bitter (born June 10, 1988) is an American former professional lacrosse player for the Charlotte Hounds and Denver Outlaws of the outdoor Major League Lacrosse from 2011-2013. Bitter was also drafted by Buffalo Bandits of the indoor National Lacrosse League. Bitter played college lacrosse for the University of North Carolina.

Personal
The son of Ward and Nancy Bitter, Bitter is one of 6 kids who all played lacrosse at the college level. His father, Ward Bitter II, is in the Boston College Hall of Fame for being an All-American lacrosse player at Boston College.

Lacrosse career
Bitter accepted a scholarship to the University of North Carolina, where he was given the Jay Gallagher Award (given to the most valuable freshman on the North Carolina lacrosse team) his freshman year and named All-ACC 3 times. He was named 1st team All-American his sophomore and junior year and 2nd team All-American his senior year. His junior year, he was named Player of the Year in the Atlantic Coast Conference. Bitter was drafted by the Denver Outlaws 3rd overall in the 2011 MLL Collegiate Draft. He was traded to the Charlotte Hounds in a 2012 league expansion deal. In 2011, he was also selected in the 4th round of the National Lacrosse League draft by the Buffalo Bandits. Bitter was the 33rd pick overall. He was also taken in the 6th round of the North American Lacrosse League rookie entry draft with the last pick (Round 6, pick 30) by the Jacksonville Bullies. He chose to only play in the outdoor league of Major League Lacrosse. He signed an endorsement deal with Cascade Maverik Lacrosse in 2011.

Statistics

University of North Carolina

References

External links
 Tar Heels lacrosse

1988 births
Living people
Lacrosse players from New York (state)
North Carolina Tar Heels men's lacrosse players
People from Manhasset, New York
Buffalo Bandits players
Deerfield Academy alumni